Kolberg is a 1945 Nazi German historical film directed by Veit Harlan. One of the last films of the Third Reich, it was intended as a Nazi propaganda piece to bolster the will of the German population to resist the Allies.

It tells the story of the defence of the besieged fortress town of Kolberg against French troops between April and July 1807, during the Napoleonic Wars. In reality, the city's defence, led by then-Lieutenant Colonel August von Gneisenau, held out until the war was ended by the Treaty of Tilsit. In the film, the French abandon the siege.

Plot 
The film begins in 1813 after the phase of the Napoleonic Wars known in German as the Befreiungskriege (Wars of Liberation). The opening scenes show Prussian Landwehr and volunteers marching down the streets of Breslau through enthusiastic crowds. This is followed by a dialogue between King Frederick William III of Prussia and Count August von Gneisenau, in which Gneisenau explains that the siege of Kolberg taught the importance of citizen armies. Ending with the admonition that kings who cannot lead must abdicate, the scene switches to Vienna in 1806 to show the abdication of the last Holy Roman Emperor, Francis II of Austria, whom the script has Gneisenau call "an Emperor who abandoned the German people in their hour of need".

The scene set, the film moves to 1806 and a Kolberg not yet affected by war, where the inhabitants are shown enjoying life, and the town's leaders, Nettelbeck chief among them, discuss Napoleon's proclamations, and what it will mean to them. Some see the French victories as a good thing, some wonder whether to leave.  Nettelbeck alone is set on resisting the French. The film continues in this vein, with Nettelbeck struggling against cowardice, lethargy and the old-fashioned ideas of the garrison commander, to defend his city against the approaching French. Nettelbeck creates a citizen militia, in spite of the best efforts of the regular Prussian Army, has supplies collected, and strongly opposes the idea of surrender.

Finally, having been threatened with execution, and convinced that Kolberg can only be saved if a great leader can be found, Nettelbeck sends Maria on the dangerous journey to Königsberg whither the Court of Prussia has retreated, to meet with the King and with Queen Louise, who was described by Napoleon as "the only man in Prussia". Maria's journey leads to the energetic and charismatic Gneisenau being sent to Kolberg. After an initial confrontation with Nettelbeck, in order to show that there is only one leader in Kolberg, and that Gneisenau is that leader, the two work together with the army and the citizens to save the city from the French. After Kolberg is (unhistorically) saved, the film returns to 1813 after the Convention of Tauroggen, a time when Napoleon was defeated in Russia, and Prussian leaders wonder whether it is time to turn openly against him. Frederick William is convinced by Gneisenau to do so, and sits down to write the proclamation An Mein Volk ("To my People") announcing the Wars of Liberation.

Cast

 Kristina Söderbaum as Maria
 Heinrich George as Joachim Nettelbeck
 Paul Wegener as General Ludwig Moritz von Loucadou
 Horst Caspar as August Neidhardt von Gneisenau
 Gustav Diessl as Ferdinand von Schill
 Otto Wernicke as Farmer Werner
 Kurt Meisel as Claus
 Claus Clausen as Frederick William III of Prussia
 Irene von Meyendorff as Louise of Mecklenburg-Strelitz

 Greta Schröder as Sophie Marie von Voß
 Franz Herterich as Emperor Francis II
 Jakob Tiedtke as Shipowner
 Paul Bildt as Rector
 Charles Schauten as Napoléon
 Theo Shall as Louis Henri Loison
 Werner Scharf as Pietro Teulié
 Jaspar von Oertzen as Prince Louis Ferdinand of Prussia, a role edited out.

Production
The film is based on the 1823 edition of the autobiography of Joachim Nettelbeck, mayor of Kolberg, and on the 1865 play drawn from the book by Nobel laureate Paul Heyse. No reference was made to the latter as the author was Jewish. Propaganda Minister Joseph Goebbels explicitly ordered the use of the historical events for a film, which he regarded as highly suitable for the circumstances Germany faced.

Goebbels began planning for Kolberg in 1941, and the film entered production in 1943. Goebbels hired Veit Harlan, the director of Jud Süß, to direct the film on 1 June 1943. It was made in Agfacolor and cost , not  as is often stated. The number of extras is commonly exaggerated at 187,000, and claims of entire divisions of troops taking part are completely false.

Kristina Söderbaum, Harlan's wife, was cast as the lead role in the film.

Principal cinematography took place from 22 October 1943 to August 1944. The exteriors were shot in and around the cities of Kolberg, Königsberg, Treptow, Berlin, Seeburg, and Neustettin. Harlan stated that the "law of madness" applied during the film's production and that Adolf Hitler and Goebbels believed the film "could be more useful to them than even a military miracle, because they no longer believed in victory in any rational way". Goebbels worked on the film as an uncredited screenwriter.

One-fourth of the film's budget was spent on scenes cut by Goebbels. 100 railroad cars were used to transport salt to be used as snow in the film.

Release
The film premiered in La Rochelle on 30 January 1945, and the city fell to Allied forces two weeks later. It opened in a temporary cinema (U.T. Alexanderplatz) and at Tauentzien-Palast in Berlin, and ran under constant threat of air raids until the fall of Berlin to Soviet forces in May 1945. Simultaneously with the opening in Berlin it was shown to the crew of the naval base at La Rochelle at the Théâtre de la Ville. It was also screened in the Reich Chancellery after the broadcast of Hitler's last radio address on 30 January. One of the last films of the Third Reich, it never went into general release.

The city of Kolberg was declared a Festung ("fortress town") as Soviet forces neared it on 24 February 1945. Within a month of the film's opening Kolberg was under full siege (sometimes called the "Second Siege" or "Second Battle" of Kolberg), with around 70,000 trapped German civilians and military personnel. House-to-house fighting caused devastation. Kolberg fell to Soviet and Polish forces on 18 March 1945. Many civilians escaped by sea, and those who survived were permanently expelled along with all Germans in east Pomerania. The ruined city of Kolberg became part of Poland and is now known as Kołobrzeg.

The film was theatrically released by Atlas Films in West Germany in 1966.

See also
List of German films 1933–1945
Nazism and cinema

References
Notes

Works cited

External links

 
 

1945 films
1940s historical films
German historical films
German epic films
Films of Nazi Germany
1940s German-language films
Films directed by Veit Harlan
Films based on biographies
Films set in Prussia
Films set in 1806
Films set in 1807
Films set in 1813
Napoleonic Wars films
Nazi propaganda films
Siege films
War epic films
Kołobrzeg
Censored films
UFA GmbH films
Films shot at Babelsberg Studios
Cultural depictions of Napoleon
Films set in Vienna